Class V: Naval science is a classification used by the Library of Congress Classification system. This article outlines the subclasses of Class V.

V - Naval science (General)
1-995........Naval science (General)
25-55.......History and antiquities of naval science
66-69.......Navy clubs
160-165...Strategy
167-178...Tactics
200...........Coast defense
210-214.5...Submarine warfare
390-395.....Naval research
396-396.5...Military oceanography
399.........Automation in the naval sciences
400-695.....Naval education
720-743.....Naval life, manners and customs, antiquities, etc.
750-995.....War vessels: Construction, armament, etc.

VA - Navies: Organization, distribution, naval situation
10-750.....Navies: Organization, distribution, naval situation
49-395....United States
400-750...Other regions or countries

VB - Naval administration
15-(955)......Naval administration
21-124.......By region or country
170-187......Civil department
260-275......Enlisted personnel
307-309......Warrant officers
310-315......Officers
320-325......Minorities, women, etc. in navies

VC - Naval maintenance
10-580.......Naval maintenance
20-258......Organization of service
260-268.....Supplies and stores
270-279.....Equipment of vessels, supplies, allowances, etc.
280-345.....Clothing and equipment
350-410.....Subsistence.  Provisioning
412-425.....Navy yards and stations.  Shore facilities

VD - Naval seaman
7-430.......Naval Seaman
21-124.....By region or country
160-302....Drill regulations
330-335....Shooting
360-390....Small arms
400-405....Small boat service

VE - Marines
7-500......Marines
23-124....By region or country
160-302...Drill regulations
330-335...Shooting
360-390...Small arms
420-425...Barracks, quarters, etc.
430-435...Training camps

VF - Naval ordnance
1-580......Naval ordnance
21-124....By region or country
160-302...Ordnance instructions and drill books
310-315...Target practice
346-348...Naval weapons systems
350-375...Ordnance and arms (General)
390-510...Ordnance material (Ordnance proper)

VG - Minor services of navies
20-2029........Minor services of navies
20-25.........Chaplain
50-55.........Coast guard and coast signal service
70-85.........Naval communication by telegraphy, telephone, etc.
90-95.........Naval aviation
100-475.......Medical service
500-505.......Public relations.  Press.  War  correspondents
2000-2005.....Social work.  Social welfare services
2020-2029.....Recreation and information service

VK  -Navigation. Merchant marine
1-1661..........Navigation. Merchant marine
15-124.........History, conditions, etc.
321-369.8.....Harbors. Ports
381-397........Signaling
401-529........Study and teaching
549-572........Science of navigation
573-587........Nautical instruments
588-597........Marine hydrography. Hydrographic surveying
600-794........Tide and current tables
798-997........Sailing directions. Pilot guides
1000-1249......Lighthouse service
1250-1299......Shipwrecks and fires
1299.5-1299.6..Icebreaking operations
1300-1491......Saving of life and property
1500-1661......Pilots and pilotage

VM - Naval architecture. Shipbuilding. Marine engineering
1-989.........Naval architecture. Shipbuilding. Marine engineering
15-124.......History
165-276......Study and teaching
295-296......Contracts and specifications
298.5-301....Shipbuilding industry. Shipyards
311-466......Special types of vessels
595-989......Marine engineering
975-989.....Diving

References

Further reading 
 Full schedule of all LCC Classifications
 List of all LCC Classification Outlines

V